Billingsville School is a historic Rosenwald School building located in the Grier Heights community of Charlotte, Mecklenburg County, North Carolina. It was built in 1927 as a school for African-American students.  It is a one-story, hip-roofed school building in the Bungalow and American Craftsman style with a brick veneer, symmetrical facade, and a steeply pitched, front gable porch. A small, flat-roofed, brick addition was built in 1949.

It was added to the National Register of Historic Places in 1999.

References

Rosenwald schools in North Carolina
School buildings on the National Register of Historic Places in North Carolina
School buildings completed in 1927
Schools in Charlotte, North Carolina
National Register of Historic Places in Mecklenburg County, North Carolina
1927 establishments in North Carolina